
Gmina Świętajno is a rural gmina (administrative district) in Olecko County, Warmian-Masurian Voivodeship, in northern Poland.

Villages
Gmina Świętajno contains the villages and settlements of Barany, Borki, Chełchy, Cichy, Dudki, Dworackie, Dybowo, Gryzy, Jelonek, Jurki, Jurkowo, Kije, Krzywe, Kukówko, Leśniki, Mazury, Niemsty, Orzechówko, Pietrasze, Połom, Rogojny, Rogowszczyzna, Smolnik, Sulejki, Świdrówko, Świętajno, Wronki and Zalesie.

Neighbouring gminas
Gmina Świętajno is bordered by the gminas of Ełk, Kowale Oleckie, Kruklanki, Olecko, Stare Juchy and Wydminy.

References
Polish official population figures 2006

Swietajno
Olecko County